Tatija is a village located in Rajasthan's Jhunjhunu district.

Another famous landmark of this village is that it is near to Singhana, the popular bypass from where the foreign tourists pass by while going to the Mandava Castle located in Sikar.

You must see Tatija if you would like to have the sense of what a village is like in Rajasthan. It is located 180 km from Delhi, Dhaula Kuan.

The main thing or event which is held in Tatija is the local fair of Baba Bhainya; the Baba Bhainya is a deity who has 52 bhairons in his army, and to please him, people of the village wake up for whole night and worship him by loud music which can be heard up to 3 km; this music is not of drum beats of any electronic music.

References 

Villages in Jhunjhunu district